Ten Silver Coins: The Drylings of Acchora is a young adult novel written by Andrew Kooman. It is a fantasy novel and its protagonist is Jill Strong. Ten Silver Coins was Kooman's debut novel. Kooman wrote the majority of the book in 2004 while working in Asia. It is the first novel in a three-novel series.

References

2009 fantasy novels
2009 Canadian novels
Canadian fantasy novels
Canadian young adult novels
English-language novels
Young adult fantasy novels
2009 debut novels